Oldham County Schools is a school district serving Oldham County, Kentucky.

Anchorage Independent School District district residents may attend Oldham County Schools for high school. The other choice is Jefferson County Public Schools  (JCPS).

Schools

Elementary schools
Buckner Elementary School
Camden Station Elementary School 
Centerfield Elementary School
Crestwood Elementary School
Goshen Elementary School
Harmony Elementary
Kenwood Station Elementary School
LaGrange Elementary School
Locust Grove Elementary School

Middle schools
East Oldham Middle School
North Oldham Middle School
Oldham County Middle School 
South Oldham Middle School

High schools
North Oldham High School
Oldham County High School
South Oldham High School

Additional programs
Buckner Alternative High School
Oldham County Preschool
Oldham County Schools Arts Center
Arvin Education Center
Creative and Performing Arts Academy (CAPAA)

References

External links
Oldham County Schools

Education in Oldham County, Kentucky
School districts in Kentucky